{{Infobox indoor American football team
| name = Lakeland Thunderbolts
| logo = ThunderBolts4.PNG
| helmet = Lakeland Thunderbolts Helmet Logo.png
| founded = 2005
| folded = 2010
| city = Lakeland, Floridaat the Lakeland Center
| misc = 
| uniform = 
| colors = Black, Gold, White
  
| coach = Teddy Keaton
| owners = Bennie King
| chairman =
| president = 
| general manager = Bennie King
| mascot = Gunny
| cheerleaders = Thunderbolts Dance Team
| nicknames = 
| league = 
American Indoor Football Association (2005-2007)
On hiatus (2008-2010)
| team_history =
 Lakeland Thunderbolts (2005–2010)
| no_league_champs = 
| no_conf_champs = 0
| no_div_champs = 0
| league_champs = 
| conf_champs = 
| div_champs = 
| playoff_appearances = 
| no_playoff_appearances = 0
| arena_years = 
 Lakeland Center  (2005–2010)
}}

The Lakeland Thunderbolts were a professional indoor football team. They were a member of the American Indoor Football Association (AIFA). They played their home games at the Lakeland Center.

 History 
The Lakeland Thunderbolts began in 2005 as an expansion member of the National Indoor Football League, finishing their inaugural season with a 6–8 record and losing in the first round of playoffs to the Rome Renegades with a score of 53–7.

Lakeland's 2006 season ended with a 44–18 loss to the Fayetteville Guard, in Fayetteville, North Carolina, during the second round of the NIFL playoffs. The Thunderbolts finished the regular season fourth overall (third in the Atlantic Conference) with a 12–2 record.

After the 2006 season ended, the 'Bolts decided to move to the American Indoor Football Association. Perhaps the team's biggest victory so far is their 39–36 win over the defending champion Canton Legends on March 11, 2007, ending their 12-game winning streak dating back from the previous season (The previous team to defeat Canton was the Reading Express on April 23, 2006, at the Canton Memorial Civic Center by a score of 56–18). Lakeland secured the 2007 Southern Division Championship after an 84–62 win over the Mississippi Mudcats on June 16, 2007. On June 23, they would win AIFA Championship Bowl I at the Florence Civic Center, defeating the Reading Express by a score of 54–49.

On Saturday, October 20, 2007, it was announced that the Thunderbolts had declined on rejoining the AIFA for 2008.

On Tuesday December 4, 2007, the AIFA announced they have reached an agreement with the Lakeland Center, and the Thunderbolts will return in 2009.  There is a possibility that Thunderbolts could play in the Southern Indoor Football League in 2010. The Thunderbolts will likely return to the American Indoor Football Association in 2011

 Season-By-Season 

|-
| colspan="6" align="center" | Lakeland Thunderbolts (NIFL)
|-
|2005 || 6 || 8 || 0 || 3rd Atlantic South || Lost AC Quarterfinal (Rome)
|-
|2006 || 12 || 2 || 0 || 1st Atlantic South || Won AC Quarterfinal (Montgomery Maulers)Lost AC Semifinal (Fayetteville)
|-
| colspan="6" align="center" | Lakeland Thunderbolts (AIFA)
|-
|2007 || 11 || 2 || 0 || 1st Southern || Won Round 1 (Carolina)Won SD Championship (Mississippi)Won Championship Bowl I (Reading)
|-
|2008 || colspan="5" rowspan="3" valign="middle" align="center" | Did Not Play'''''
|-
|2009
|-
|2010
|-
!Totals || 33 || 14 || 0
|colspan="2"| (including NIFL and AIFA playoffs)

2007 Season Schedule

External links 
 
 Lakeland Thunderbolts' official myspace
 Thunderbolts' 2007 Stats

American Indoor Football Association teams
Sports in Lakeland, Florida
American football teams in Florida
American football teams established in 2005
2005 establishments in Florida